Peter L. Harrison is a Distinguished Professor at Southern Cross University, Australia, and is also the founding director of the Marine Ecology Research Centre. He is a leading expert in coral reproduction ecology and larval restoration.

World first discovery 
While conducting his PhD at James Cook University in Townsville in 1981, Harrison was working with a small group of other PhD researchers that first discovered the phenomenon known as Mass Coral Spawning. This occurred following detailed monitoring of hundreds of corals and during night dives at Magnetic Island where through torchlight the team observed millions of coral sperm and eggs filling the waters around them in a synchronized mass multi-species spawning event. This discovery was the first scientific documentation of a mass coral spawning event, and Harrison and the team published their first paper on the phenomenon 3 years later in 1984 .The publication was titled Mass Spawning in Tropical Reef Corals by Peter Harrison, Russell Babcock, Gordon Bull, James Oliver, Carden Wallace and Bette Willis. This study has inspired many other research projects on coral reproduction and mass coral spawning events in different reef regions around the world. His current major research focus is coral and reef restoration and he leads large multidisciplinary projects developing the world’s first larger-scale successful coral larval restoration projects using millions of coral larvae to restore damaged reefs in the Philippines and on the Great Barrier Reef.

Recognition 
Harrison has received many prestigious research and University teaching awards throughout his career. Harrison and the team were awarded a Eureka Prize for Environmental Research in 1992 for their groundbreaking discovery of mass coral spawning on the Great Barrier Reef. Harrison led a United Nations funded mission to assess the impacts of the first Gulf War on the coral reefs of Kuwait, and has a new coral species discovered in the Arabian Gulf named after him (Porites harrisoni). Peter has been appointed to a range of national and international scientific committees including ten years as a member of the Australian Government’s Threatened Species Scientific Committee and various expert panels. He has appeared in more than 30 television documentaries and given hundreds of media interviews highlighting science research discoveries to promote conservation and environmental management. Most recently, a sculpture of Peter Harrison was created by Jason deCaires Taylor for the Museum of Underwater Art as part of the Ocean Sentinels above the surface exhibition in 2022. This was to recognize his contributions to research in the marine environment.

Publications 
Harrison has published over 200 scientific research papers, reports and books. His work has been cited almost 15,000 times.

References

External links
 

Living people
Year of birth missing (living people)
Academic staff of Southern Cross University
James Cook University alumni
Australian ecologists
Australian marine biologists